URM Stores, Inc. (formerly United Retail Merchants) of Spokane, Washington is an American retailers' cooperative serving independent supermarkets in Idaho, Montana, Oregon, and Washington. It was founded in 1921 and is a member of Retailer Owned Food Distributors & Associates. It is an owner of Western Family Foods. It purchased Rosauers Supermarket in 2000.

Its affiliated supermarkets include Family Foods, Harvest Foods, Rosauers, Yoke's Fresh Market, and Super 1 Foods.

Data Breach

In the fall of 2013, URM stores suffered a large scale data breach, resulting in the theft of magnetic stripe track data from payment cards. Washington state credit unions alone reported US $687,598.48 in total losses as a result of this breach. To reduce the costs to banks resulting from future data skimming/breach attacks, beginning in October 2015 United States merchants will be liable for fraud losses if their payment systems are not enabled to accept EMV cards, which are designed to prevent counterfeiting.

References

External links 
 U.R.M. Stores web site

American companies established in 1921
Retail companies established in 1921
Companies based in Spokane, Washington
Economy of the Northwestern United States
Supermarkets of the United States
Retailers' cooperatives in the United States
1921 establishments in Washington (state)